The cycling competition at the 1984 Summer Olympics in Los Angeles consisted of three road cycling events and five track cycling events.  For the first time, women's cycling events were included in the Olympic program.  Also newly introduced in these Games was the men's points race event.

Road cycling

Men’s events

Women’s events

Track cycling

Participating nations
359 cyclists from 54 nations competed.

Medal table

See also
 Cycling at the Friendship Games

References

 
1984
Cycling
1984 in track cycling
1984 in road cycling
1984 in cycle racing